Azaz Subdistrict  is a subdistrict of Azaz District in northwestern Aleppo Governorate of northern Syria. Administrative centre is the city of Azaz. Neighbouring subdistricts are Sawran to the east, Tell Rifaat to the south, and the subdistricts Afrin and Bulbul of Afrin District to the west or southwest, respectively. To the north is the Kilis Province of Turkey.

At the 2004 census, the subdistrict had a population of 47,570.

Cities, towns and villages

References 

Azaz District
Azaz